Launched in February 2014 by Stephanie Frazier Grimm, the Confetti Foundation organizes birthday parties for sick children who are in the hospital on their special day.

History
Headquartered in Newport, RI, the Confetti Foundation was founded by Stephanie Frazier Grimm to try to enable families to “shift their focus from their child’s illness for a mere half an hour, during which time they would celebrate the child.”  For just half an hour over an oft-extended period of time dealing with doctors, medical tests and other invasive procedures, the child would be able to do something “normal” like other kids do, and celebrate their special day.

One of the inspirations behind creating the foundation was Stephanie's own experience.  She was hospitalized during her 13th birthday and remembers how bad it was.  There was no one to do anything for her birthday.

In 2010, Stephanie was reminded of this when her best friend Brandy gave birth eight weeks early to a baby boy who had a whole slew of complications.  Brandy was driving hours every day to the NICU hospital with her toddler and husband to visit Christian and during those drives, Stephanie chatted to her about all sorts of regular daily things just to distract her from what was happening with Christian. During one of those conversations Brandy mentioned how one of Christian's hospital “buddies” was leaving the hospital and they were having a celebration.  Stephanie then asked about what the children got at the hospital for their birthdays and was shocked to hear nothing.  The only time a party happened was when a child left.  Stephanie knew at that point she wanted to change that.

Mission
The Confetti Foundation aims to ensure all hospitalized kids will be able to celebrate their birthdays.  To facilitate this, it supplies party starter kits. In 2014 the goal was to raise funds so that 500 boxes could be supplied and that the foundation has a presence in every single state of America.

Activities
The Foundation organizes celebratory parties in hospitals and sends birthday fairies to implement them.  The birthday fairies are volunteers who have contacted their local children's hospital to work with The Confetti Foundation and hand deliver every single party supply box to the hospital.

The birthday box has everything needed for a birthday party. There are 50 different themes the celebrant's family can select. Each box contains: a banner, between four and eight settings of disposable plates, napkins, utensils, decorations, a handmade card and T-shirt for the celebrant.   An extra “gift” can be added to the themed box such as a princess book (princess theme) or a gym bag (sports theme).

Fundraising
Each birthday party box costs around $22, and as of June 2014, enough money was raised to package and distribute 335 boxes to 64 hospitals! The Confetti Foundation seeks to bolster its fundraising by partnering with businesses which will benefit from a PR push via the foundation's social media activities.

Featured
The Confetti Foundation appeared in Sugarlands Distilling Co.’s ‘The Top 50 Feature’ in January 2016.

References

Organizations established in 2014
Children's charities based in the United States
Charities based in Rhode Island